Naina Das (also known as "Naina Dash") is an Odia actress who is Bhubaneswar based and has acted for Odia Cinema and also in television.

Filmography

Besides being a popular face in Odisha and Telugu films,Das has achieved a phenomenal success in a lot of Odia TV serials. She has anchored in the longest running serial in Odisha,"Kalyani-An Innovative Health Programme".

References

External links

1984 births
Living people
Indian film actresses
Indian television actresses
Actresses from Odisha
21st-century Indian actresses